Centigrade is a historical forerunner to the Celsius temperature scale, synonymous in modern usage.

Centigrade may also refer to:

 Centigrade (angle), one hundredth of a "gradian" (a unit of plane angle)
 Centigrade (2007 film), a short thriller film
 Centigrade (2020 film), a survival thriller film
 1001° Centigrades, an album by French Zeuhl band Magma in 1971
 Centigrade 232, an album and book by Robert Calvert, recorded in 1986, released in 2007

See also
Celsius (disambiguation)